QualiEd College (abbreviated to QC) is a secondary school established in 2003 in Hong Kong by the QualiEd Educational Organization. It was approved by the Education Bureau to be managed under Man Kwan Educational Organization starting from 1December 2009. The school is located at 2, Kan Hok Lane, Tiu Keng Leng, Tseung Kwan O, Hong Kong. The full name of QualiEd is Quality Education. Pak Kau College, Pak Kau Continuing Education College, The Jockey Club Eduyoung College and Eduyoung Continuing Education College are run by the same educational organization (Man Kwan Educational Organization).

QualiEd also provides some non-academic subjects to students such as Drama.
As QualiEd is a secondary school, it provides general secondary curriculum i.e.
 Secondary One to Secondary Seven (Old Secondary Curriculum)
 Secondary One to Secondary Six (New Secondary Curriculum)

QualiEd Professional and Continuing Education College
QualiEd Professional and Continuing Education College(QPCEC) is a subsidiary college of QualiEd College established in 2000 in Hong Kong by the QualiEd Educational Organization. The school is located at 2, Kan Hok Lane, Tiu Keng Leng, Tseung Kwan O, Hong Kong. QPCEC and QC are using the same teaching building. 
QPCEC provides higher education courses to Hong Kong students, such as: Diploma Programme, Higher Diploma Programme, Pre-AD, and Top-up Degree Programme.

Schools in Hong Kong